Das Damen was an alternative rock band from New York City, United States, formed in 1984. The band released several albums before splitting up in 1991. The band's name is fake German and roughly translates to "the ladies" (the correct German form would be Die Damen).

History
The band was formed in the 1984 by Jim Walters (vocals, guitar), Alex Totino (guitar, vocals), Phil Leopold von Trapp (bass guitar, vocals), and Lyle Hysen (drums). Totino and Hysen were previously in the New York Hardcore punk band, The Misguided. They released their eponymous debut album on Thurston Moore's Ecstatic Peace! label in 1986. They subsequently signed to SST Records and released Jupiter Eye in 1987, which has been described as "quasi-hardcore that touched on MC5-like garage psychedelia". A third album, Triskaidekaphobe, followed. It featured a guest appearance by ex-MC5 guitarist Wayne Kramer.

The Marshmellow Conspiracy EP (1988) was withdrawn when it was discovered that the track "Song for Michael Jackson to $ell" was in fact an uncredited version of The Beatles' "Magical Mystery Tour". It was later reissued without the track. Two of the three remaining songs were from the previous LP, one in a new version featuring Kramer. 

The band's next release was the 1989 album Mousetrap, on the Twin/Tone label. Von Trapp left to be replaced by David Motamed. The band then moved on to City Slang for the live album Entertaining Friends, recorded at CBGB, and their final release was the High Anxiety mini-set in July 1991, co-released by City Slang and Sub Pop. 

Motamed later joined Cell.

Musical style
Ira Robbins of Trouser Press described the band's debut as "six badly mixed long songs that are noisy but fun". They mixed alternative rock with metal, psychedelic rock, and acid rock.

Discography

Albums
Das Damen (1986), Ecstatic Peace
Jupiter Eye (1987), SST
Triskaidekaphobe (1988), SST
Mousetrap (1989), Twin/Tone
Entertaining Friends (live) (1990), City Slang
High Anxiety mini (1991), City Slang/Sub Pop

Singles, EPs
Marshmellow Conspiracy EP (1988), SSTCategory:SST Records artists
"Noon Daylight" (1989), What Goes On / Twin/Tone (UK Indie No. 12)
"Sad Mile" / "Making Time" (1989), Sub Pop - Sub Pop Singles Club release

References

1984 establishments in New York City
1991 disestablishments in New York (state)
Alternative rock groups from New York (state)
Ecstatic Peace! artists
Musical groups established in 1984
Musical groups disestablished in 1991
SST Records artists
Sub Pop artists
Musical quartets